Micromacronus is a bird genus in the family Cisticolidae endemic to the Philippines. Long considered to be monotypic, its members are known as miniature babblers or miniature tit-babblers. As the scientific as well as the common names indicate, their habitus resembles a diminutive version of the tit-babblers (Macronus). The genus was only described in 1962, upon the description of the first species, which had been collected by collector Manuel Celestino and Godofredo Alcasid, a zoologist at the Philippine National Museum. The genus was formerly placed in the family Timaliidae but a molecular phylogenetic study published in 2012 found that the genus was more closely related to species in the family Cisticolidae.

The genus contains just two species; the Visayan miniature babbler, Micromacronus leytensis, and the  Mindanao miniature babbler, Micromacronus sordidus. The two species in the genus have sometimes been treated as a single species. The Visayan miniature babbler is found on the islands of Samar, Leyte and Biliran in the central Philippines, whereas the Mindanao miniature babbler is restricted to Mindanao only.

References

Further reading
 Collar, N. J. & Robson, C. 2007. Family Timaliidae (Babblers)  pp. 70 – 291 in; del Hoyo, J., Elliott, A. & Christie, D.A. eds. Handbook of the Birds of the World, Vol. 12. Picathartes to Tits and Chickadees. Lynx Edicions, Barcelona.

 
Bird genera

Taxa named by Dean Amadon
Taxonomy articles created by Polbot